In Greek mythology, dreams were sometimes personified as Oneiros or Oneiroi. In the Iliad of Homer, Zeus sends an Oneiros to appear to Agamemnon in a dream, while in Hesiod's Theogony, the Oneiroi are the sons of Nyx (Night), and brothers of Hypnos (Sleep).

Oneiros was also, according to some myths, the name of one of the sons of Achilles with Deidamia.

Sources
For the ancient Greeks, dreams were not generally personified. However, a few instances of the personification of dreams, some perhaps solely poetic, can be found in ancient Greek sources.

In Homer's Iliad, Zeus decides to send a "baleful dream" to Agamemnon, the commander of the Greek army during the Trojan War. An Oneiros is summoned by Zeus, and ordered to go to the camp of the Greeks at Troy and deliver a message from Zeus urging him to battle. The Oneiros goes quickly to Agamemnon's tent, and finding him asleep, stands above Agamemnon's head, and taking the shape of Nestor, a trusted counselor to Agamemnon, The Oneiros speaks to Agamenon, as Zeus had instructed him.

The Odyssey locates a "land of dreams" past the streams of Oceanus, close to Asphodel Meadows, where the spirits of the dead reside. In another passage of the Odyssey, truthful dreams are said to come through a gate made of horn, while  deceitful dreams come  through a gate made of ivory (see Gates of horn and ivory).

Hesiod in his genealogical poem the Theogony, makes the "tribe of Dreams" (φῦλον Ὀνείρων), among the many offspring of Nyx (Night), without a father. Their siblings include: Moros (Doom), Ker (Destiny), Thanatos (Death), Hypnos (Sleep), Momus (Blame), Oizys (Pain), Keres (Destinies), Nemesis (Retribution), Eris (Discord), and other abstract personifications.

Euripides, in his play Hecuba has Hecuba call "lady Earth" the "mother of black-winged dreams". The second-century AD geographer Pausanias mentions seeing statues of an Oneiros and Hypnos lulling a lion to sleep. He writes that the statue was surnamed Epidotes.

Related figures
Related figures are the Somnia (Dreams), the thousand sons that the Latin poet Ovid gave to Somnus (Sleep), who appear in dreams. Ovid named three of the sons of Somnus: Morpheus, who appears in human guise, Icelos (was called like this by the gods)/ Phobetor (was called like this by the mortals), who appears as beasts, and Phantasos, who appears as inanimate objects.

Son of Achilles
Oneiros was also, according to some myths, the name of one of the sons of Achilles with Deidamia. His brother was Neoptolemus. He was killed by Orestes, who didn't recognize him, while fighting with him in Phocis for a place to pitch a tent.

Notes

References
 Caldwell, Richard, Hesiod's Theogony, Focus Publishing/R. Pullins Company (June 1, 1987). .
 Euripides, Hecuba, translated by David Kovacs in Euripides: Children of Heracles. Hippolytus. Andromache. Hecuba. Edited and translated by David Kovacs. Loeb Classical Library No. 484. Cambridge, Massachusetts: Harvard University Press, 1995. . Online version at Harvard University Press.
 Grimal, Pierre, The Dictionary of Classical Mythology, Wiley-Blackwell, 1996, .
 Hesiod, Theogony, in The Homeric Hymns and Homerica with an English Translation by Hugh G. Evelyn-White, Cambridge, Massachusetts., Harvard University Press; London, William Heinemann Ltd. 1914. Online version at the Perseus Digital Library.
 Homer, The Iliad with an English Translation by A.T. Murray, Ph.D. in two volumes. Cambridge, MA., Harvard University Press; London, William Heinemann, Ltd. 1924. Online version at the Perseus Digital Library.
 Homer, The Odyssey with an English Translation by A.T. Murray, PH.D. in two volumes. Cambridge, MA., Harvard University Press; London, William Heinemann, Ltd. 1919. Online version at the Perseus Digital Library.
 Hyginus, Gaius Julius, Fabulae in Apollodorus' Library and Hyginus' Fabulae: Two Handbooks of Greek Mythology, Translated, with Introductions by R. Scott Smith and Stephen M. Trzaskoma, Hackett Publishing Company,  2007. .
 Ovid. Metamorphoses, Volume II: Books 9-15. Translated by Frank Justus Miller. Revised by G. P. Goold. Loeb Classical Library No. 43. Cambridge, Massachusetts: Harvard University Press, 1916. Online version at Harvard University Press.
 Pausanias, Pausanias Description of Greece with an English Translation by W.H.S. Jones, Litt.D., and H.A. Ormerod, M.A., in 4 Volumes. Cambridge, MA, Harvard University Press; London, William Heinemann Ltd. 1918. Online version at the Perseus Digital Library.
 Smith, William; Dictionary of Greek and Roman Biography and Mythology, London (1867). Online version at the Perseus Digital Library

Greek sleep deities
Greek gods
Personifications in Greek mythology
Dreams in fiction
Children of Nyx